The 1945 Oklahoma Sooners football team represented the University of Oklahoma in the 1945 college football season. In their fifth year under head coach Dewey Luster, the Sooners compiled a 5–5 record (4–1 against conference opponents), finished in second place in the Big Six Conference championship, and outscored their opponents by a combined total of 169 to 138.

No Sooners received All-America honors in 1945, but five Sooners received all-conference honors: Omer Burgert (end); Lester Jensen (guard); Thomas Tallchief (tackle); Jack Venable (back); and John West (back).

Schedule

Rankings

The first 1945 AP Poll came out on October 7. The Sooners made their first appearance in the poll on October 28 and made their last appearance on the poll released on November 11.

Postseason

NFL Draft
The following players were drafted into the National Football League following the season.

References

Oklahoma
Oklahoma Sooners football seasons
Oklahoma Sooners football